Azienda Elettrica Ticinese (AET) is an electricity wholesaler based in Bellinzona (Ticino, Switzerland). It's a commercial independent public body owned by the canton Ticino.

AET is a public company founded in 1958, which is active in the selling, production and transport of electricity in Switzerland and abroad. AET's institutional mandate is to guarantee the procurement of electricity for the Canton of Ticino at competitive prices. AET owns and operates a number of hydroelectric and solar generation assets. Furthermore, it owns 420 km of high-voltage grid and the 2014 revenue amounted to 1.1 billion Euro.

On the 31.12.2014 the AET group had 434 employees.

External links

http://www.aet.ch 
 Annual report 2014

Electric power companies of Switzerland
Economy of Ticino
Companies based in Bellinzona